The Men's 200 metre butterfly competition of the 2014 FINA World Swimming Championships (25 m) was held on 7 December.

Records
Prior to the competition, the existing world and championship records were as follows.

The following records were established during the competition:

Results

Heats
The heats were held at 10:26.

Final
The final was held at 18:28.

References

Men's 200 metre butterfly